Molly Matthews (born 10 February 1995) is an Australian professional basketball player who plays for the Bendigo Spirit in the Women's National Basketball League.

Professional career

WNBL
Matthews made her professional debut with the Spirit in 2015. With the Spirit, she played alongside the likes of Kelsey Griffin, Gabrielle Richards and Kelly Wilson, coming off the bench playing limited minutes. Matthews has been re-signed for the 2016–17 season.

References

1995 births
Living people
Australian women's basketball players
Bendigo Spirit players
Sportswomen from Victoria (Australia)
Forwards (basketball)